Vikrant Singh Rajpoot (born 29 September 1986) is an Indian actor who works in Bhojpuri language films. He started his film career with the film Mehraru Bina Ratiya Kaise Kati.

Personal life
Singh married actress Mona Lisa in January 2017. Vikrant Singh Rajpoot was a contestant on Nach Baliye Season 8.

Filmography

Films

Television

References

External links

Living people
21st-century Indian male actors
Male actors in Bhojpuri cinema
People from Azamgarh
1986 births